The 2021–22 season was the 64th season in the existence of FC Ufa and the club's 19th & final consecutive season in the top flight of Russian football. In addition to the domestic league, FC Ufa were participated in this season's editions of the Russian Cup.

Squad

Out on loan

Transfers

In

Loans in

Out

Loans out

Released

Pre-season and friendlies

Competitions

Overview

Premier League

League table

Results summary

Results by round

Results

Relegation play-offs

Russian Cup

Round of 32

Squad statistics

Appearances and goals

|-
|colspan="14"|Players away from the club on loan:

|-
|colspan="14"|Players who appeared for Ufa but left during the season:

|}

Goal scorers

Clean sheets

Disciplinary record

References

FC Ufa seasons
Ufa